Western Stadium (កីឡដ្ឋានវេស្ទើន) was the home stadium of Cambodian League club Western University FC. It has capacity of 1000. This stadium was broke ground in 2014 and opened in 2015. It located in the  Tuol Kouk District  of Phnom Penh, Cambodia. The stadium was demolished in early October 2022.

See also
 2016 Cambodian League

References

http://www.westernsportforall.com/public/

Football venues in Cambodia
Buildings and structures in Phnom Penh